Victor Lubecke is an electrical engineer at the University of Hawaii at Manoa, Honolulu. He was named a Fellow of the Institute of Electrical and Electronics Engineers (IEEE) in 2016 for his leadership in the development of microwave transducers for biomedical application.

References

Fellow Members of the IEEE
Living people
21st-century American engineers
Year of birth missing (living people)
American electrical engineers